Piazza del Popolo is a city square in Ascoli Piceno, Italy.

Buildings around the square
Basilica of San Francesco
Aedicule of Lazzaro Morelli

Piazzas in Ascoli Piceno